Liopterus atriceps is a species of water beetle in the genus Liopterus.

References

Dytiscidae
Beetles described in 1862